Pizza quattro formaggi  (four cheese pizza) is a variety of pizza in Italian cuisine that is topped with a combination of four kinds of cheese, usually melted together, with (rossa, red) or without (bianca, white) tomato sauce. It is popular worldwide, including in Italy, and is one of the iconic items from pizzerias' menus.

History
Traditionally, the cheeses include Mozzarella, as the fundamental component, which maintains humidity during cooking, partially protecting the other cheeses from the strong heat of the oven. Gorgonzola is almost systematically present and the completing duo consists of other local cheeses, depending on the region, with Fontina and Parmigiano-Reggiano as the typical complements, but other variants include Pecorino, Ricotta, Stracchino, Robiola, Taleggio, smoked Provola or Caciocavallo. Beside Mozzarella, mass-produced pizzas often use Parmesan, Romano, Asiago, and other Italian-style cheeses, though some use non-Italian cheeses such as Edam, Emmental and Blue cheese. The choice of cheeses is not random, they should be full-fat or semi-fat and vary in flavour. Besides Mozzarella, the quattro formaggi usually combines a blue or mature cheese, a soft cheese (such as Emmental or Gruyère) or a creamy cheese (such as Robiola or Stracchino), and a hard cheese (parmesan or pecorino, grated).

Unlike other pizzas, like the Napolitan or the Margherita, which have an old, rich, and documented history, the Quattro Formaggi, despite its popularity and preponderance, has a less clear origin, certainly due to its composition being so obvious. It is believed to originate from the Lazio region at the beginning of the 18th century. Its less obvious and more recent versions, like the Quattro Latti pizza, can be on the opposite tracked in the history of gastronomy.

See also
 List of Italian dishes
 List of pizza varieties by country

References

quattro formaggi
Cheese dishes